The Men's team sprint took place on 2 March 2011. Sprint qualifying at 12:00 CET and finals at 14:15 CET. The defending world champions were Norway's Ola Vigen Hattestad and Johan Kjølstad while the defending Olympic champion were Norway's Øystein Pettersen and Petter Northug.

Results

Semifinals 

Semifinal 1

Semifinal 2

Final

References

FIS Nordic World Ski Championships 2011